Daniel "Dani" Edgardo Farabello (born 18 October 1973) is a former Argentine-Italian professional basketball player.

Professional career
Farabello played with Club de Regatas Vasco da Gama.

National team career
A member of the senior men's Argentine national basketball team, he competed with the squad at the 1996 Summer Olympics and 2006 FIBA World Championship.

Personal life
His son Francisco plays college basketball for the TCU Horned Frogs.

References

External links
EuroCup Profile
LatinBasket.com Profile
Spanish League Profile  
Italian League Profile 

1973 births
Living people
2006 FIBA World Championship players
Argentine expatriate basketball people in Brazil
Argentine expatriate basketball people in Spain
Argentine men's basketball players
Basketball players at the 1996 Summer Olympics
Boca Juniors basketball players
CR Vasco da Gama basketball players
Estudiantes de Olavarría basketball players
Italian expatriate basketball people in Spain
Italian men's basketball players
La Unión basketball players
Liga ACB players
Menorca Bàsquet players
Olympic basketball players of Argentina
Pallacanestro Varese players
Peñarol de Mar del Plata basketball players
Sportspeople from Entre Ríos Province
Point guards
Quilmes de Mar del Plata basketball players
Shooting guards
Goodwill Games medalists in basketball
Competitors at the 2001 Goodwill Games
1994 FIBA World Championship players